Hypochalcia staudingeri is a species of snout moth in the genus Hypochalcia. It was described by Émile Louis Ragonot in 1887. It is found in Russia.

References

Moths described in 1887
Phycitini